Shahadat Hossain Dipu (born 4 February 2002) is a Bangladeshi cricketer. He made his Twenty20 debut on 26 November 2020, for Beximco Dhaka in the 2020–21 Bangabandhu T20 Cup. Prior to his Twenty20 debut, he was named in Bangladesh's squad for the 2020 Under-19 Cricket World Cup. In February 2021, he was selected in the Bangladesh Emerging squad for their home series against the Ireland Wolves. He made his first-class debut on 26 February 2021, for the Bangladesh Emerging team against Ireland Wolves. He made his List A debut on 14 March 2021, also for the Bangladesh Emerging team against Ireland Wolves.

In March 2021, in the opening round of the 2020–21 National Cricket League, he scored his maiden century in first-class cricket, with 108 runs for Chittagong Division.

References

External links
 

2002 births
Living people
Bangladeshi cricketers
Chittagong Division cricketers
People from Chittagong